Jean-Marie-Raphaël Le Jeune (born Jean-Marie; 12 April 1855 – 21 November 1930) was a Canadian Roman Catholic priest, linguist, author, and newspaper publisher.

Born in Pleyber-Christ, France, Le Jeune entered an Oblate seminary in Nancy, France, in 1873 and took his vows on 12 December 1875. He volunteered for missionary service and in 1879 was sent to New Westminster, British Columbia, Canada. Under the supervision of Bishop Paul Durieu, Le Jeune studied Chinook Jargon, a pidgin of Chinookan, Nootkan, French, and English. He moved on to Fraser Canyon, where he learned more native languages, and then to St. Mary's mission in the Lower Fraser Valley.

Over the next years Le Jeune traveled throughout the Kamloops region proselytizing to the native communities. In 1891 he became rector of St. Joseph's Church on the Kamloops Reserve and in 1893 he became the superior of St. Louis's Mission, a post he held until 1929.

By his own account, Le Jeune spoke more than twenty native languages. In 1890 he adapted Duployan shorthand to Chinook Jargon. The system was widely adopted among the native community and in 1891 Le Jeune launched a newspaper written in English and Chinook Jargon called the Kamloops Wawa. Le Jeune wrote a number of pamphlets about native languages such as Practical Chinook vocabulary (1886), Prayers in the Okanagan language (1893), Polyglott manual of prayers (1896, contributor), and Chinook rudiments (1924).

Le Jeune died in 1930 at New Westminster and is buried at Mission. Lac Le Jeune, near Logan Lake, bears his name.

External links
Chinook Vocabulary (1892)
Chinook manual, or, Prayers, hymns and catechism in Chinook (microform) (1896)

References

1855 births
1930 deaths
Roman Catholic missionaries in Canada
19th-century Canadian Roman Catholic priests
Linguists from Canada
Franco-Columbian people
People from New Westminster
People from Finistère
Missionary Oblates of Mary Immaculate
Chinook Jargon
Creators of writing systems
French Roman Catholic missionaries
Missionary linguists
French emigrants to Canada
20th-century Canadian Roman Catholic priests